solutions by stc, formerly Qualitynet, is a data and Internet service provider operating in Kuwait. The company provides services to residential and business customers. Qualitynet was acquired by stc in 2019, and has been rebranded under the name "solutions by stc" as of 10 November 2020.

History
The company was established in 1998, after the Ministry of Communications made it possible for private companies to provide data communication services. Batelco and National Bank of Kuwait are shareholders. QualityNet achieved ISO 9001:2000 certification.

The company's backbone network is based on a fiber optic medium with a centralized ATM switch and access nodes to provide coverage in Kuwait. The access to the backbone network is primarily through Frame Relay, ADSL and ISDN networks. Teleglobe and EMIX are used for international connectivity.

References

Telecommunications companies established in 1998
Telecommunications companies of Kuwait
Kuwaiti companies established in 1998